On August 10, 2016, Larnell Bruce, a black 19-year-old, was run over by a Jeep driven by Russell Courtier, a member of the European Kindred gang, outside a 7-Eleven convenience store in Gresham, Oregon; Bruce died 3 days later.

In March 2019, Courtier was found guilty of murder and hate crime, while his girlfriend Colleen Hunt, who had been in the Jeep with Courtier, pleaded guilty to manslaughter. Courtier was sentenced to life with a minimum of 28 years, while Hunt received a 10-year sentence.

The case was the subject of a two-part BBC Two documentary series called A Black And White Killing: The Case That Shook America.

References

2016 deaths
2016 murders in the United States
Deaths by person in Oregon
Male murder victims
People murdered in Oregon
Racially motivated violence against African Americans
2016 in Oregon
African-American history of Oregon
Gresham, Oregon